Timothy John McConnell Jr. (born March 25, 1992) is an American professional basketball player for the Indiana Pacers of the National Basketball Association (NBA). He played college basketball for the Duquesne Dukes and the Arizona Wildcats.

High school career
McConnell attended Chartiers Valley High School in the Pittsburgh-area borough of Bridgeville, Pennsylvania, where he played for his father, Tim. As the team captain his senior year, he averaged 34.2 points, 8.2 rebounds and 9.1 assists per game, earned first-team all-state honors, was named the Associated Press's Pennsylvania Class 3A Player of the Year, and also named the male athlete of the year for all sports by the Pittsburgh Post-Gazette. He led the Colts to a 29-2 record, the WPIAL championship, and a berth in the Class 3A state championship game as a senior in which he lost to Philadelphia's Neumann-Goretti.

College career

As a freshman for Duquesne in 2010–11, McConnell averaged 10.8 points, 3.8 rebounds, 4.4 assists, and 2.8 steals per game in 32 appearances (30 starts), earning 2011 Atlantic 10 Freshman of the Year honors.

As a sophomore in 2011–12, he averaged 11.4 points, 4.4 rebounds, 5.5 assists, and 2.8 steals per game, helping the Dukes to a 16-15 record and earning third-team All-Atlantic 10 Conference honors and a spot on the A-10 All-Defensive Team.

In April 2012, he transferred to Arizona where he was subsequently forced to sit out the 2012–13 season due to NCAA transfer rules. McConnell's transfer was motivated by a desire to compete for a national championship.

In the 2013–14 season McConnell helped lead the Wildcats to a 21-0 record to start the season before teammate Brandon Ashley injured his foot and was sidelined for the rest of the season. The season culminated in an Elite 8 appearance for the Wildcats. As a senior, McConnell was voted first-team All-Pac-12 and named to the Pac-12 All-Defensive Team, and he helped lead Arizona to another appearance in the Elite Eight.

Professional career

Philadelphia 76ers (2015–2019)
After going undrafted in the 2015 NBA draft, McConnell joined the Philadelphia 76ers for the 2015 NBA Summer League. On September 27, 2015, he signed with the 76ers. He played well during preseason, averaging 6.2 points and 4.8 assists in five games, earning himself a spot on the 76ers' opening night roster. He went on to make his NBA debut in the team's season opener against the Boston Celtics on October 28. In 27 minutes of action, he recorded four points, four assists, and three steals in a 112–95 loss. On February 6, 2016, while starting at point guard in place of the injured Ish Smith, McConnell tied his season-high of 17 points in a 103–98 win over the Brooklyn Nets. On March 23, in a loss to the Denver Nuggets, he had a 17-point outing for a third time in 2015–16. At the season's end, he received two votes in the 2016 NBA All-Rookie Team voting.

In July 2016, McConnell re-joined the 76ers for the 2016 NBA Summer League. On December 11, 2016, he had a near triple-double with 12 points, 10 rebounds and nine assists in a 97–79 win over the Detroit Pistons. On January 6, 2017, he had a career-high 17 assists in a 110–106 loss to the Boston Celtics, becoming just the fourth player in franchise history to hit that mark in a single contest. His total was two off the Philadelphia's all-time record of 19 assists, initially set by Maurice Cheeks in 1987, and later matched by Dana Barros in 1995. McConnell hit a game-winning buzzer beater against the New York Knicks with a turnaround jump shot on the baseline on January 11, 2017.

On November 25, 2017, McConnell had 15 points and 13 assists in a 130–111 win over the Orlando Magic. On January 15, 2018, he scored a career-high 18 points in a 117–111 win over the Toronto Raptors. On February 12, 2018, McConnell recorded his first career triple-double with 10 points, 10 rebounds and 11 assists in a 108–92 win over the Knicks. He also matched a career high with six steals and became the first player in franchise history to record a triple-double off the bench. In Game 4 of the 76ers' second-round playoff series against the Celtics, McConnell had a career-high 19 points, seven rebounds and five assists in a 103–92 win, helping Philadelphia cut the series deficit to 3–1. On June 13, 2018, the 76ers announced they had exercised the fourth-year option on their contract with McConnell.

Indiana Pacers (2019–present)
On July 3, 2019, McConnell signed a two-year deal worth $7 million with the Indiana Pacers. He was one of three players on the roster using T.J. as their professional first name, along with teammates T. J. Warren and T. J. Leaf.  He joined the team as it entered the 2020 NBA Bubble and exited after a first round loss in the 2020 NBA Playoffs to eventual Eastern Conference Champions Miami Heat.

On March 3, 2021, McConnell broke the NBA record for most steals in a half with 9. He also became the first player since Mookie Blaylock in 1998 to record a triple-double with points, steals, and assists, as well as the first one to do so off the bench.

In August 2021, the Pacers re-signed McConnell to a 4-year, $35 million deal. On December 1, he suffered a right wrist injury in a 111–114 loss to the Atlanta Hawks. On December 7, he underwent surgery and was ruled out for at least 10-to-12 weeks.

On January 16, 2023, McConnell recorded a career-high 29 points, scoring 25 points in the first half, in a loss to the Milwaukee Bucks. On January 21, as a starter, McConnell recorded his 3rd career triple-double with 18 points, 12 assists, and 10 rebounds.

Career statistics

NBA

Regular season

|-
| style="text-align:left;"| 
| style="text-align:left;"| Philadelphia
| 81 || 17 || 19.8 || .470 || .348 || .634 || 3.1 || 4.5 || 1.2 || .1 || 6.1
|-
| style="text-align:left;"| 
| style="text-align:left;"| Philadelphia
| 81 || 51 || 26.3 || .461 || .200 || .811 || 3.1 || 6.6 || 1.7 || .1 || 6.9
|-
| style="text-align:left;"|
| style="text-align:left;"| Philadelphia
| 76 || 1 || 22.4 || .499 || .435 || .795 || 3.0 || 4.0 || 1.2 || .2 || 6.3
|-
| style="text-align:left;"|
| style="text-align:left;"| Philadelphia
| 76 || 3 || 19.3 || .525 || .333 || .784 || 2.3 || 3.4 || 1.0 || .2 || 6.4
|-
| style="text-align:left;"|
| style="text-align:left;"| Indiana
| 71 || 3 || 18.7 || .516 || .294 || .833 || 2.7 || 5.0 || .8 || .2 || 6.5
|-
| style="text-align:left;"|
| style="text-align:left;"| Indiana
| 69 || 3 || 26.0 || .559 || .313 || .688 || 3.7 || 6.6 || 1.9 || .3 || 8.6
|-
| style="text-align:left;"|
| style="text-align:left;"| Indiana
| 27 || 8 || 24.1 || .481 || .303 || .826 || 3.3 || 4.9 || 1.1 || .4 || 8.5
|- class="sortbottom"
| style="text-align:center;" colspan="2"| Career
| 481 || 86 || 22.2 || .503 || .327 || .769 || 3.0 || 5.0 || 1.3 || .2 || 6.9

Playoffs

|-
| style="text-align:left;"| 2018
| style="text-align:left;"| Philadelphia
| 10 || 2 || 15.5 || .694 || .667 || .600 || 2.6 || 2.3 || .6 || .0 || 5.5
|-
| style="text-align:left;"| 2019
| style="text-align:left;"| Philadelphia
| 9 || 0 || 8.3 || .444 || – || –  || .7 || 1.2 || .2 ||  .1 || 2.7
|-
| style="text-align:left;"| 2020
| style="text-align:left;"| Indiana
| 3 || 0 || 9.3 || .375 || – || .500 || 2.0 || 2.3 || .0 || .0 || 2.3
|- class="sortbottom"
| style="text-align:center;" colspan="2"| Career
| 22 || 2 || 11.7 || .563 || .667 || .571 || 1.7 || 1.9 || .4 || .0 || 3.9

College

|-
| style="text-align:left;"| 2010–11
| style="text-align:left;"| Duquesne
| 32 || 30 || 30.6 || .498 || .402 || .683 || 3.8 || 4.4 || 2.8 || .2 || 10.8
|-
| style="text-align:left;"| 2011–12
| style="text-align:left;"| Duquesne
| 31 || 31 || 34.3 || .509 || .432 || .836 || 4.4 || 5.5 || 2.8 || .3 || 11.4
|-
| style="text-align:left;"| 2013–14
| style="text-align:left;"| Arizona
| 38 || 38 || 32.3 || .454 || .360 || .620 || 3.6 || 5.3 || 1.7 || .2 || 8.4
|-
| style="text-align:left;"| 2014–15
| style="text-align:left;"| Arizona
| 38 || 38 || 30.5 || .498 || .321 || .829 || 3.8 || 6.3 || 2.2 || .1 || 10.4
|- class="sortbottom"
| style="text-align:center;" colspan="2"| Career
| 139 || 137 || 31.8 || .490 || .380 || .749 || 3.9 || 5.4 || 2.3 || .2 || 10.2

Franchise records
 First player in Philadelphia 76ers history to record a triple-double off the bench. In the final game of the regular season Markelle Fultz achieved the same feat.

NBA Records
 NBA Record most steals in a half (9).

Personal life
His father, Tim, is one of the most successful coaches in WPIAL history. After many successful runs with the Chartiers Valley High School Boys and Girls basketball teams, McConnell was summoned by Bishop Canevin's athletic director, Dale Checketts, to become the head coach of the Bishop Canevin High School Boys basketball team, a position recently vacated by T.J's roommate at Duquesne University, Gino Palmosina. Additionally, he is often seen jogging at Collier Park, which is also the location of the T.J. McConnell Memorial Court.  He played at Waynesburg College (now Waynesburg University) from 1984 to 1986. 

T.J. has two siblings: Matthew and Megan. Matthew "Matty" McConnell took his basketball talents to Robert Morris University before his graduation in 2018. Matthew and T.J. both share the same notable distinction as the only two players in the history of Chartiers Valley High School basketball to accrue 2,000 points in their high school careers. Megan McConnell, a former star basketball player at Chartiers Valley High School, is currently one of the lead guards for Duquesne University's Women's basketball program. 

His aunt, Suzie McConnell-Serio, was an All-American at Penn State (1985–1988), Olympic gold medalist and WNBA standout prior to being inducted to the Women's Basketball Hall of Fame in 2008. She started her college coaching career at Duquesne.

He married his high school sweetheart, Valerie, at Holy Child Parish (now known as Corpus Christi Parish), in September 2017; teammate Nik Stauskas, and his roommate at Duquesne University, Gino Palmosina, served as the groomsmen.

Awards and honors
High school
 AP first-team all-state honors 
 AP Pennsylvania Class 3A Player of the Year

College
NCAA Tournament West Region All-Tournament Team (2015)
District IX All-District Team USBWA (2015)
Pac-12 Tournament All-Tournament Team (2015)
First-team All-Pac-12 (2015)
Second-team All-Pac-12 (2014)
2x Pac-12 All-Defensive Team (2014, 2015)
Third-team All-Atlantic 10 (2012) 
Atlantic 10 All-Defensive Team (2012) 
Atlantic 10 Rookie of the Year (2011) 
Atlantic 10 All-Rookie Team (2011) 
ECAC Rookie of the Year (2011) 
CollegeInsider.com Freshman All-America (2011)

See also

 List of National Basketball Association single-game steals leaders

References

External links

 Arizona Wildcats bio
 Duquesne Dukes bio

1992 births
Living people
American men's basketball players
Arizona Wildcats men's basketball players
Basketball players from Pittsburgh
Duquesne Dukes men's basketball players
Indiana Pacers players
Philadelphia 76ers players
Point guards
Undrafted National Basketball Association players